"Why Do We Want (What We Know We Can't Have)" is a song written by Don King and David Woodward, and recorded by American country music artist Reba McEntire.  It was released in July 1983 as the first single from the album Behind the Scene.  The song reached #7 on the Billboard Hot Country Singles & Tracks chart.

Chart performance

References

1983 singles
1983 songs
Reba McEntire songs
Song recordings produced by Jerry Kennedy
Mercury Records singles